Krzesimir Marcin Dębski (born 26 October 1953 in Wałbrzych) is a Polish composer, conductor and jazz violinist. His music career as a musician has been that of a performer as well as composer of classical music, opera, television and feature films.

Professional career

Krzesimir Dębski studied composition with Andrzej Koszewski, and conducting with Witold Krzemieński, at the Paderewski Academy of Music in Poznań, Poland. Following graduation, Dębski became interested in jazz. Since 1982, as the leader and violinist of the jazz group String Connection, he has performed in the United States, Canada and over 25 countries in Europe.

In 1986 Dębski has cut down on his concert performances and concentrated primarily on composition. He has composed more than 60 symphonic and chamber music pieces, including an opera, 2 symphonies, religious works and 9 instrumental concertos. Since 1986, he has composed the music for over 70 films, received 8 platinum albums and has composed music for the highest-grossing movie in Polish film history, With Fire and Sword.

As deputy chairman of the Polish Association of Contemporary Music, Dębski has written music for film, theater, symphony, chamber orchestra and experimental ensembles. As a composer, he won the Fryderyk Award (the Polish equivalent for the Grammy Award). He was also awarded The International Film Music Academy, coveted "Philip" prize presented to him by the legendary film composer, Ennio Morricone.

Krzesimir Dębski has conducted concerts in which the following international stars performed: José Carreras, Nigel Kennedy, Adam Makowicz, The Canadian Brass, Vadim Repin, Mark O’Connor, Jean-Luc Ponty, John Blake, Ewa Malas-Godlewska and José Cura.

Awards
Krzesimir Dębski has been awarded numerous prizes for his jazz musicianship and composition work. The prizes include a.o.: First Prize at the World Competition of Jazz Ensembles (Belgium), and the Stanislaw Wyspiański Award from The Ministry of Culture (Warsaw, Poland). Readers of the monthly jazz magazine "Jazz Forum" have bestowed upon Dębski the honor of "Musician, Composer and Violinist Of The Year" from 1983 to 1986. "Down Beat" magazine rated Krzesimir Dębski among the top ten violinists in the world.

In 1986, Dębski received First Prize at the 25th Anniversary Spring Festival of Music, a composers' competition in Poland. In 1988, The Canadian Film Academy nominated Dębski for a Genie Award. The same year, he received a special award for his musical work with children from the Prime Minister of Poland.

Family
The parents of Krzesimir Dębski survived the Kisielin massacre. He is married to singer Anna Jurksztowicz.

Krzesimir Dębski in the press

As a film composer he is much sought after, and for most music lovers his name is associated with that area of activity. He has recently written music for screen versions of many masterpieces of Polish literature; he also composes for Hollywood.
 
He has also made a brilliant career for himself as a jazzman. In 1985, he was ranked as one of the ten most distinguished jazz violinists in the world in the survey of the prestigious American magazine DownBeat.

All the same, he has not abandoned classical music, the writing of which he still regards as his most important creative task. "I have worked in nearly all the fields of the music world," he said in an interview for the "Studio" monthly in 1999; "rock men greet me as a rock musician, jazzmen - as a jazzman, still others - as a film composer. But I am personally convinced that classical music is my proper domain. I dedicate about 80 per cent of my time, or more in some periods, to the composition of contemporary classical music. Unfortunately, the world of contemporary music is so small that at times I cannot help having the impression that I could easily suffocate in it. And, for that matter, I do not seem to be fully accepted in that world. [...] ‘Oh, that’s him,’ they say, ‘he’s already been everywhere, done everything, does he really have to impose himself on us now?’ But I don’t complain - I have many performances. So far, I have refrained from releasing my music on record (though I could have done it at my own cost a long ago), but now I’d like to announce some releases with my compositions. The "Warsaw Autumn" has never presented my works, but I hope to be found worthy of this honour when I celebrate my 80th birthday... [...]. My pieces are performed every month, also frequently abroad. I feel happy that my works are played at usual philharmonic concerts, not only at festivals." 
("Studio" 1999 no. 5)

Krzesimir Dębski comments on Ukrainian nationalistic crimes in Volhynia, where his grandparents were murdered.

Selected compositions

Works for orchestra
 Musica per archi (1985) - for string orchestra
 Passacaglia - improvisazioni (1990) – for symphony orchestra
 Synchromie - Dance Fantasy (1990) - for symphony orchestra
 Three Forms (1990) – for symphony orchestra
 Moment Musical (1992) – for symphony orchestra
 Toccata (1993) – for symphony orchestra
 Sinfonietta (1993) – for symphony orchestra
 Preludium - Interludium - Postludium (1995) – for string orchestra
 Zyklus (1996) – for symphony orchestra
 Tempi concertati (1996) – for string orchestra
 Musica Dominicana (2001) – for wind orchestra
 Autuminty (2007) – for symphony orchestra

Works for solo instruments with orchestra 
 Fantasy (1978) – for organ and symphony orchestra 	
 Impromptu (1990) – for violin, cello, piano and symphony orchestra
 Solo, duo, trio e orchestra (1990) - for violin, cello, piano and symphony orchestra
 Concerto for violin no. 1 (1990) – for violin and symphony orchestra
 Concerto for piano [Chechnyan] (1991) – for piano and symphony orchestra
 Concerto for French horn (1995) – for French horn and symphony orchestra
 Concerto per flauto dolce nr 1 (1997) – for flute and string orchestra 
 Concerto for clarinet (1998) – for clarinet and string orchestra
 Concerto for flauto no. 2 (1998) – for flute and symphony orchestra
 Concerto for violin no. 2 (1998) – for violin and symphony orchestra
 Double concerto (1999) – for violin, viola and symphony orchestra 
 Notturno (2000) – for violin, viola and symphony orchestra 
 Landscape (2000) – for clarinet and symphony orchestra
 Quasi una fantasia (2000) – for violin and string orchestra 
 Sounds from Serengeti (2002) – for strings, oboe and string orchestra 
 Concerto for cello (2004) – for cello and symphony orchestra
 Solemn Concerto (2005) – for trompet, organ and string orchestra 
 Q + O (2005) – for quartett and symphony orchestra
 Concerto for Three Clarinets (2012) – for three clarinets and symphony orchestra

Vocal works 
 Oratorium Pie Jesu Domine (1988) – for soprano, tenor, mixed choir and symphony orchestra
 Missa puerorum (1988) – for boys choir, oboe, clarinet, bassoon, organ, percussion and string orchestra
 Missa brevis (1998) - for boys choir, oboe, clarinet, bassoon and organ
 Psalmodia Paratum cor meum Deus (1989) – for mixed choir a cappella
 Laudate Dominum (1990) – for female choir, oboe, clarinet, bassoon and organ
 Biografioły [to the poetry of Stanisław Barańczak](1993) – for 6 male voices 
 7 Songs [to the poetry of Wisława Szymborska] (1997) – for soprano, tenor, female choir and symphony orchestra
 Misterium (2000) – for soprano, recitations, mixed choir and orchestra
 I Symfonia Nihil homine mirabilius (2002) – for mezzo-soprano, mixed choir and symphony orchestra
 II Symfonia Ver redit (2003) – for soprano, improviser, mixed choir and symphony orchestra
 Forms (2006) – for voices, mixed choir and symphony orchestra
 Psalm nr 1 [to the poetry of Czesław Miłosz] (2007) – for mixed choir and symphony orchestra
 3 songs Lux Aeterna (2007) – for mixed choir a cappella
 Cosmopolis (2008) - for mixed choir and symphony orchestra

Recordings (selection) 
 1984 - TRIO (with String Connection)
 1986 - String Connection Live in Warsaw
 1991 - Montreal Ballad (Debski and Vasvari Group)
 1995 - The Choir
 1995 - Total Eclipse
 1996 - Blow Up (with pianist Rolf Zielke)
 1998 - Witaj Gwiazdo Zlota
 1999 - Ogniem i Mieczem - Platinum in Poland for over 200.000 sold copies
 2000 - Fuego
 2000 - Era of Love
 2002 - The Flute Concerto and The Two Stradivarius Concerto
 2004 - Symphony Nihil Homine Mirabilius
 2019 - Grooveoberek (with band MAP)

Film scores (selection) 

 1987 - The Young Magician - Director: Waldemar Dziki
 1988 - King Size - Director: Juliusz Machulski
 1991 - V.I.P. - Director: Juliusz Machulski
 1993 - Szwadron - Director: Juliusz Machulski
 1996 - Matka swojej matki - Director: Robert Gliński
 1997 - Autoportret z kochanką - Director: Radosław Piwowarski
 1998 - Ciemna strona Wenus - Director: Radosław Piwowarski
 1999 - With fire and sword - Director: Jerzy Hoffman
 2001 - W pustyni i w puszczy - Director: Gavin Hood
 2002 - Tam i z powrotem - Director: Wojciech Wójcik
 2003 - An Ancient Tale: When the Sun Was a God - Director: Jerzy Hoffman
 2009 - Było sobie miasteczko... (There once was a town...) directed by Tadeusz Arciuch and Maciej Wojciechowski
 2011 - Battle of Warsaw 1920 - Director: Jerzy Hoffman
 2012 - Polish Roulette - Director: Olaf Lubaszenko

See also
Music of Poland

References

External links
 Krzesimir Dębski in Polish National Opera
 Polish composers in Hollywood
 Krzesimir Dębski & Polish Film Festival in L.A.
 Krzesimir Dębski at PWM Edition
 Krzesimir Dębski at culture.pl

1953 births
Living people
Polish film score composers
Male film score composers
Polish composers
People from Wałbrzych
Eurovision Song Contest conductors